Thomas William Sweeny (December 25, 1820 – April 10, 1892) was an Irish-American soldier who served in the Mexican–American War and then was a general in the Union Army during the American Civil War.

Birth and early years
Sweeny was born in Cork, Ireland, on Christmas Day, 1820. He immigrated to the United States in 1833. In 1846, he enlisted as a second lieutenant in the 2nd New York Volunteers, and fought under General Winfield Scott in Mexico. Sweeny was wounded in the groin at the Battle of Cerro Gordo, and his right arm was so badly injured at the Battle of Churubusco that it had to be amputated. For his heroics, his fellow servicemen nicknamed him "Fighting Tom". Despite this possibly career-ending injury, he continued serving with the 2nd US Infantry until the outbreak of the Civil War. Sweeny was active in the Yuma War (1850–1853), fighting in several engagements against native Americans.

Civil War
At the outbreak of the Civil War, Sweeny was in command of the arsenal at St. Louis, Missouri.  In reply to efforts of Confederate sympathizers to induce him to surrender that important post, he declared that before he would do so, he would blow it up.  As second in command, he participated in the capture of Camp Jackson in May 1861 and later assisted in organizing the Home Guards. He was chosen as the brigadier general of that organization.

Sweeny commanded the Fifty-second Illinois at Fort Donelson. At Shiloh, in command of a brigade, he successfully defended a gap in the Union line. He was wounded in the battle having received two shots in his only remaining arm and a shot in one of his legs. Sweeny kept the field until the close of the fight, exciting the admiration of the whole army. He returned to command his regiment but returned to brigade command when General Pleasant A. Hackleman was killed at Corinth. He commanded the Second Division of the Sixteenth Army Corps in the Atlanta campaign. At the Battle of Atlanta Sweeny's division intercepted John B. Hood's flank attack.  Sweeny got into a fistfight with his corps commander, General Grenville M. Dodge, when Dodge broke protocol and personally directed one of Sweeny's brigades during the fight. Sweeny received a court-martial for these actions but was acquitted. He mustered out of the volunteers in August 1865, and was dismissed for going AWOL by the end of the year.

Fenian raids
In 1866, he commanded the ill-fated Fenian invasion of Canada, after which he was arrested for breaking neutrality laws between the United States and Britain, but was soon released. He was reinstated with his former rank of major later that year, and retired from the Regular Army in May 1870 as a brigadier general.

Death
Sweeny retired to Astoria on Long Island. He died there on April 10, 1892, and is buried in Green-Wood Cemetery in Brooklyn.

See also

 List of American Civil War generals (Union)

References

 Jack Morgan, Through American and Irish Wars: The Life and Times of General Thomas W. Sweeny 1820-1892 (Dublin: Irish Academic Press, 2005).

External links
 
 Wild Geese bio

1820 births
1892 deaths
19th-century Irish people
American amputees
American military personnel of the Mexican–American War
Burials at Green-Wood Cemetery
Irish emigrants to the United States (before 1923)
Irish soldiers in the United States Army
Members of the Irish Republican Brotherhood
People from County Cork
People of Illinois in the American Civil War
People of the Fenian raids
Union Army generals